The Edward Pulsifer House is a historic house located on Illinois Route 71 in Hennepin, Illinois. Edward Pulsifer, a prominent Hennepin businessman, had the house built in 1844, four years after he came to the city. Pulsifer began his enterprise by running a general store with his brother; his later ventures included local real estate and a shipping business on the Illinois River. His house is designed in the Federal style and is one of Putnam County's best remaining examples of the style. The -story brick house is topped by a gable roof; the brick in the gables forms a projecting coping at the top, and each gable has paired chimneys at its peak. Brick parapets connect the pairs of chimneys, a stylistic element often seen in Federal architecture in Illinois. The entrance and the roof line feature matching dentillated entablatures; the entrance also features a transom, sidelights, and flanking pilasters.

The house was added to the National Register of Historic Places on September 4, 1979.

References

Houses on the National Register of Historic Places in Illinois
Federal architecture in Illinois
Houses completed in 1844
Buildings and structures in Putnam County, Illinois
National Register of Historic Places in Putnam County, Illinois